The second cabinet of Ana Brnabić was the Government of Serbia from 2020 to 2022. It was elected on 28 October 2020 by a majority vote in the National Assembly. It succeeded the first cabinet of Ana Brnabić, which was formed in July 2017, shortly after Aleksandar Vučić's departure as prime minister due his election as president of Serbia.

The cabinet is composed of members of the Serbian Progressive Party (SNS), Socialist Party of Serbia (SPS), Movement of Socialists (PS), Party of United Pensioners of Serbia (PUPS), Social Democratic Party of Serbia (SDPS), Serbian People's Party (SNP) and independents. The Alliance of Vojvodina Hungarians (VMSZ), Justice and Reconciliation Party (SPP), and United Peasant Party (USS) serve as confidence and supply in the government.

The government was in acting mode from 15 February 2022, when the 12th convocation of the National Assembly ended due to the proclamation of snap parliamentary elections. It was succeeded by the third cabinet of Ana Brnabić on 26 October 2022.

History 
The cabinet comprised ministers from the Serbian Progressive Party (SNS), Socialist Party of Serbia (SPS), Serbian Patriotic Alliance (SPAS), Movement of Socialists (PS), Social Democratic Party of Serbia (SDPS) and the Party of United Pensioners of Serbia (PUPS), as well as some without a party affiliation. The cabinet had 11 women out of 21 total ministers and was among the most gender-balanced governments in the world. Three new ministries were also formed: the Ministry of the Village Care, Ministry of Family and Demography and the Ministry of Human and Minority Rights and Social Dialogue.

Cabinet members

References

Cabinets of Serbia
2020 establishments in Serbia
Cabinets established in 2020